Wendell Curran Mayes (July 21, 1919 – March 28, 1992) was a Hollywood screenwriter.

Background
Wendell Curran Mayes was born on July 21, 1919, in Hayti, Missouri. His father, Von Mayes, was a lawyer, and his mother, Irene (née Haynes), was a teacher. Wendell attended primary school in Caruthersville, Missouri;  Battle Ground Academy in Franklin, Tennessee; and Central College in Fayette, Missouri. He had one year of law school at Cumberland University in Lebanon, Tennessee.

Career
Mayes moved to Washington, D.C. to work as a filing clerk in the Agricultural Adjustment Administration, then to New York, where he worked in the theater. Subsequently he was an exterminator and gold prospector in Arizona, a truck driver in Texas. During World War II he worked as a welder in a Baltimore shipyard, and joined the Navy as a petty officer shipbuilder. In 1945 he was discharged from the Navy and moved back to New York.

Screenwriter
Mayes began as an actor, then turned to writing. An episode No Riders that he wrote for Pond's Theater received a good review in a Los Angeles newspaper and Billy Wilder hired him to work on the script to the film The Spirit of St. Louis.

For Anatomy of a Murder, Mayes received a New York Film Critics Circle Award for best screenplay in 1959 and an Oscar nomination in 1960. It is claimed to be one of the best trial movies of all time.

Personal life and death
Wendell Mayes died of cancer aged 72 on March 28, 1992, in Santa Monica, California. His last script was Criminal Behavior that starred Farrah Fawcett.

Works

Screenwriting credits include:
The Spirit of St. Louis (with Billy Wilder and Charles Lederer), Warner Brothers, 1957
The Enemy Below, Twentieth Century-Fox, 1957
The Way to the Gold, Twentieth Century-Fox, 1957
From Hell to Texas (also known as Manhunt) (with Robert Buckner), Twentieth Century-Fox, 1958
The Hunters, Twentieth Century-Fox, 1958
The Hanging Tree (with Halsted Welles), Warner Brothers, 1959
Anatomy of a Murder, Columbia, 1959
North to Alaska (with John Lee Mahin, Martin Rackin, and Claude Binyon), Twentieth Century-Fox, 1960
Advise and Consent, Columbia, 1962
Von Ryan's Express (with Joseph Landon), Twentieth Century-Fox, 1965
In Harm's Way, Paramount, 1965
Hotel, Warner Brothers, 1967
The Stalking Moon (with Alvin Sargent), National General Pictures,1968
The Revengers, National General Pictures, 1972
The Poseidon Adventure (with Stirling Silliphant), Twentieth Century-Fox, 1972
Death Wish, Paramount, 1974
Bank Shot, United Artists, 1974
Go Tell the Spartans, Avco-Embassy, 1978
Love and Bullets (with John Melson), Associated Film Distribution,1979
Monsignor, Twentieth Century-Fox, 1982

References

External links

Wendell Mayes biography

1919 births
1992 deaths
American male screenwriters
People from Hayti, Missouri
Screenwriters from Missouri
20th-century American male writers
20th-century American screenwriters